"Party" is a song by American singer Chris Brown featuring fellow American singer Usher and American rapper Gucci Mane. It was released by RCA as the second single from the former's eighth studio album, Heartbreak on a Full Moon (2017) on December 16, 2016. "Party" was the only top 40 hit from the album, peaking at number 40 on the Billboard Hot 100.

Music video
The music video for "Party" was directed by Chris Brown and directed by Riveting Entertainment. The video for "Party" was made available on December 18, 2016, on iTunes, YouTube, and Vevo. It features cameo appearances from Internet viral video stars Kida the Great and Ayo & Teo in the video. The video begins with Brown entering an underground club. To gain entry he begins to dance to the song "Kriss Kross" with a group of kids surrounding him in a circle. Usher then appears, flashing his NBA Championship ring he won as a minority owner of the Cleveland Cavaliers and slides down an escalator to begin dancing. Gucci Mane performs his verse with a group of kids surrounding him dancing.

Promotion
Chris Brown, along with Gucci Mane, performed the track during the BET Awards 2017.

Credits and personnel
Credits adapted from Tidal.
 Chris Brown – vocals, composer
 Usher Raymond IV – vocals, composer
 Gucci Mane – vocals, composer
 Lyrica Anderson – composer
 Ishmael Sadiq Montague – composer
 Melvin Moore – composer
 Floyd Bentley – composer
 Christopher Dotson – composer
 Jaycen Joshua – mixing engineer
 Patrizio Pigliapoco – recording engineer

Charts

Weekly charts

Year-end charts

Certifications

Release history

References

2016 singles
2016 songs
Chris Brown songs
Usher (musician) songs
Gucci Mane songs
RCA Records singles
Songs written by Chris Brown
Songs written by Usher (musician)
Songs written by Gucci Mane
Songs written by Hitmaka
Songs written by Lyrica Anderson
Song recordings produced by Yung Berg